A five-part abrogative referendum was held in Italy on 12 June 2022. Voters were asked to decide on the repeal of five articles or decrees relating to the functioning of the Italian judicial system. Each of the five questions was submitted by nine Italian regions, all governed by the centre-right coalition.

The 2022 Italian local elections were held on the same day.

Procedure

Article 75 of the Constitution of Italy provides the possibility to hold a referendum to abolish a law or part of it. According to the law 352/70, the request for a referendum must come either from 500,000 signatures or from the approval of the resolutions voted by at least five regional councils. The signatures must be collected on special forms with the object of the referendum on it and they must be authenticated by a public officer. All Italian citizens who are able to vote can sign a referendum. Starting from August 2021, it is possible to collect signatures by using a digital ID too.

The signatures or the resolutions must be filed by 30 September of each year at the Central Office for the referendum at the Court of Cassation. The filing of the signatures cannot take place in the year prior to a general election and in the six months following the election, in order to avoid any overlapping between the referendum and the general election. The Central Office must evaluate by 15 December the compliance of the rules of the proposed referendum according to the previous prerequisite, by checking the validity of each signature collected or if the law the referendum intend to abolish is still in force.

Following the approval of the prerequisite of the proposed referendum, the Constitutional Court must set the date of the deliberation in the Council Chamber no later than 20 January of the following year, and it must appoint a Judge Rapporteur. The Constitutional Court, after the meeting in the Council Chamber, must pronounce if the requested referendum is allowed or rejected. According to the second paragraph of Article 75 of the Constitution, referendum having as their object taxes, the State budget, amnesty and the international treaties cannot take place. If a referendum is allowed, the President of the Republic sets the date for the referendum, which must take place in a date between 15 April and 15 June. A referendum, in order to be valid, must be voted by at least 50% + 1 of the people entitled to vote, and it must be approved by the 50% + 1 of the voters.

Referendum initiative
Maurizio Turco, Secretary of the Transnational Radical Party, announced the intention to start collecting signatures for a new referendum regarding justice, following a scandal that involved the CSM. During an interview at Porta a Porta in May 2021, Matteo Salvini, the leader of Lega, said he would join the Radical Party's campaign, since he believed that a justice reform would never be approved in Parliament with the Democratic Party and the Five Star Movement.

On 2 July, the Committee Just Justice Referendum started the collection of signatures, hoping to get 1 million signatures before September. Secretary of the Democratic Party Enrico Letta defined the referendum as propaganda, accusing Salvini of wanting to buy time, also announcing that he wanted to file his own bill on justice. The President of the National Magistrate Association Giuseppe Santalucia also criticized the usage of the referendum, preferring the justice reform under discussion in Parliament. On 7 August, Salvini claimed they were close to the goal of 500,000 signatures.

The Cannabis Committee asked for an extension of the due date of the collection of signatures and the filing to the Court of Cassation since the cities were delaying the delivery of the certifications of the signatures. The Council of the Ministers approved on 29 September an extension for the collection of signatures to 31 October, with the desertion of the ministers of Lega, since it would have benefited the cannabis referendum they were against.

Although the committee claimed to have collected at least 700,000 signatures for each of the six referendums, well above the threshold of 500,000 valid signatures required, on 30 October the committee filed the referendums to the Court of Cassation with the support of the resolutions voted by nine regional councils led by the centre-right coalition: Basilicata, Friuli Venezia Giulia, Liguria, Lombardia, Piemonte, Sardegna, Sicilia, Umbria and Veneto. This choice led to a loss of 2,5 million euro reimbursement expected from the collection of signatures, thus excluding the Radical Party as representatives of the promoting committee since only the regional delegates (led by the centre-right) will be able to fund TV ads and collect subsidies as representatives of the referendum committee.

On February, an order of the day promoted by Lega asked the government to merge in a single day the 2022 Italian local elections and the referendum. The merger between two different kinds of elections are regulated by the Legislative Decree n. 98/2011, which doesn't include the abrogative referendum since the abstention can be used as a way to oppose the referendum (to be approved, an abrogative referendum must reach at least 50%+1 of turnout). The only time an abrogative referendum was held along with another election was in 2009, when the 2009 Italian referendum was merged to the second round of the 2009 Italian local elections; 2020 Italian constitutional referendum was also held with 2020 Italian regional elections and 2020 Italian local elections.
Finally, the Council of the Ministers approved the merger of the first round of the Italian local elections and the referendum in a single day, on 12 June. Only 8,5 million voters will be called for the local elections during the first round, while the quorum requires at least 23 million of voters.

Proposed referendum

Abolition of Severino Law's enforcement decree
 Ballot colour: red
The first question aimed to repeal the automatic disqualification or suspension of politicians found guilty of crimes from the offices they hold. The law 190/2012, also known as the Severino law, named after then Justice Minister of the Monti Cabinet, Paola Severino, aimed to fight corruption, to increase transparency in the Public Administration and finally to identify cases of ineligibility for national or local election, as well as cases where suspension from public office is appropriate. Those who have received a sentence of more than two years in jail for crimes such as organized crime, terrorism, drug trafficking and crimes against the public administration were to be removed from public office, or suspended in case of a first instance judgment.

The most famous application of the decree was in 2013, when former Prime Minister Silvio Berlusconi was sentenced to four years imprisonment and fined 7 million euros for tax fraud. In October the Committee on Election and Parliamentary Immunity ruled out the disqualification of Berlusconi, and the next month the Senate voted for his expulsion. Berlusconi filed an appeal to the European Court of Human Rights, but he withdrew his application after the Court of Milan rehabilitated him in 2018 after he completed a course of community service.

The decree was also contested in 2014 by the Mayor of Salerno, Vincenzo De Luca, and the Mayor of Naples, Luigi De Magistris, who both were found guilty in a first instance judgment during two different trials and thus were suspended from their offices. Since the law doesn't rule out the eligibility of those who were condemned in a first instance judgment, De Luca could run in the meantime as President of Campania for the 2015 regional election but was suspended for a short time immediately after he was elected. The two mayors filed an appeal to the Regional Administrative Court (TAR), raising a question of constitutional legitimacy. They were both re-admitted and awaited a judgment filed to the Constitutional Court. However, the Constitutional Court ruled that the appeal was rejected and that the Severino Law was not unconstitutional. By the time the Constitutional Court rejected their appeals, the Appeal Court acquitted both of them, and thus they could return to their offices.

The Ordinary Court of Genoa raised a plea of constitutionality to the Constitutional Court due to the suspension of a regional councillor in a first instance judgment. In 2021 the Constitutional Court ruled that it found nothing unlawful in the Severino Law.

The President of the National Association of Italian Municipalities and Mayor of Bari, Antonio Decaro, expressed his wish to change the Severino Law over the suspension of local politician, either by the Parliament or by the referendum.

Pre-trial detention
 Ballot colour: orange
In order to reduce the risk of re-offending before trial, a suspect may be detained pre-trial. The promoters of the article aimed to repeal the pre-trial detention motivated by risk of re-offending, leaving in place pre-trial detention due to the risk of altering evidence or flight, reducing the risk of detaining people subsequently found to be innocent.

Separation of the functions of the magistrates
 Ballot colour: yellow
The promoters of the article aimed to disallow prosecutors from becoming judges and vice versa, forcing magistrates to choose at the beginning of their career whether they want to be prosecutors or judges.

Lay members' vote in Judicial Councils
 Ballot colour: grey
Judicial Councils are composed of two thirds of magistrates and one third of "lay members" (lawyers and university professors), but the latter are excluded from taking part in the four-yearly review of the magistrates' work and professionalism. The referendum promoters aimed to remove the exclusion of lay members from taking part in the evaluation of magistrates.

Election of judges of the High Council of the Judiciary
 Ballot colour: green
The promoters aimed to remove the requirement for 25 to 50 signatures in support of the candidacy of a magistrate for the High Council of the Judiciary.

Rejected referendums
 The Associazione Luca Coscioni collected 1.2 million signatures in favour of the decriminalization of euthanasia by repealing the crime of the murder of a consenting person. While euthanasia in Italy is illegal, following a 2019 verdict of the Constitutional Court during the DJ Fabo case, under certain circumstances a person can request a passive euthanasia by refusing any treatment. The Constitutional Court urged the Parliament in 2018 to approve a law about the decriminalization of assisted suicide within a year, but the Parliament has not acted on it. In February 2022, the Constitutional Court rejected the referendum, citing the risk of failing to ensure the "necessary protection of human life".
 The Associazione Luca Coscioni, Meglio Legale (Legal is Better) and Italian Radicals collected 630,000 signatures in favour of repealing the crime of growing cannabis plants. The Constitutional Court rejected the referendum due to a possible violation of the international treaties signed by Italy.
 The Constitutional Court rejected one of the six referendums promoted by the Just Justice Committee on the direct liability of magistrates due to being "manipulative and unclear".
 An attempt to promote a referendum to ban hunting was made by Sì aboliamo la caccia (Yes let's abolish hunting), who announced they had collected 520,000 signatures. However, only half of the signatures were eventually filed, and only 120,000 of the signatures were considered valid, below the 500,000 signatures required to hold a referendum.

Campaign positions

Endorsements

Yes

Politicians

Judges

Organisations

Newspapers

No

Politicians

Judges

Organisations

Newspapers

Committees

Main political parties

Opinion polls

Turnout

Rejected referendum

Questions

Results 
The referendum did not meet the minimum turnout quota of 50%, and therefore did not provide a valid outcome. Each of the five question ballots reached a turnout of less than 20.5%.

See also 
 2022 Italian local elections

References 

Referendum
Italy
Referendums in Italy
Referendum
Law of Italy